Roger Ludvigsen (born 28 July 1965 in Alta) is a Sami guitarist, percussionist and composer from Kautokeino.

Biography 
In the 1970s, he was part of Ivnniiguin, the country's first Sami-language rock band. In 1981, he worked on the music production for the play Min duoddarat – Våre vidder, which was the first work to be performed at the Beaivváš Sámi Theatre.
Together with Leif Isak Eide Nilut and Bjørn Ole Rasch, he launched in 1991 the Sami group Orbina, who released the albums Orbina (1993) and Orbina II (2001).

He has played and recorded with a range of famous artists, both on record and in concert, including Mari Boine (Gula Gula from 1989 and Eight Seasons from 2002), Steinar Albrigtsen (Stripped from 2001), Nils Petter Molvær (Khmer from 1998), Sidsel Endresen and Lynni Treekrem.

Awards and honors
In 1997, Ludvigsen received the Áillohaš Music Award, a Sámi music award conferred by the municipality of Kautokeino and the Kautokeino Sámi Association to honor the significant contributions the recipient or recipients has made to the diverse world of Sámi music.

In 2002, he won the Edvardprisen in the musical drama class for the music he composed for the play Ayra-Leena performed by Beaivvás Sámi Teáhter. As part of the prize, he received 40,000 Norwegian crowns, a diploma, and a unique stone trophy designed by Bruno Oldani.

In 2005, Ludvigsen was selected to be the year's festival artist for the Arctic Arts Festival in Harstad, Norway. At the festival, he performed a commissioned piece with 9 other artists. 

In 2019, Ludvigsen was awarded the Nordlysprisen for his extensive and groundbreaking contributions to both Sámi and Norwegian music over the decades. For example, he founded the first Norwegian-Sámi rock band, Unicorn, whose name was later changed to Ivnniiguin, with other teenagers from Kautokeino. This band went on to become hugely popular throughout Sápmi and is still a popular addition to NRK Radio's Sámi playlists.

Film composer
List of films on which Roger Ludvigsen has produced music.

 Høstens første bilde (1993)
 Bulle bor ikke her (2002)
 Solens sønn og månens datter (1993)
 Johannas jul (2000)
 Eagle's Nest (2001)
 Urkraften fra vidda (2003)
 Holbbit Libaidit (2003)
 Ole Henrik Magga (2003)
 Kautokeino-opprøret (2007)
 Barentsfashion Dokumentar (2008)

References 

1965 births
Living people
Áillohaš Music Award winners
Norwegian Sámi musicians
Norwegian film score composers
Male film score composers
Norwegian guitarists
Norwegian male guitarists
People from Alta, Norway